Ron Gilbert is an American video-game designer, programmer, and producer. His games are generally focused on interactive story-telling, and he is arguably best known for his work on several LucasArts adventure games, including Maniac Mansion and the first two Monkey Island games.

While a student in 1983, he co-wrote Graphics BASIC, and he then worked on action games for HESware, which went out of business. He afterwards joined Lucasfilm Games (later LucasArts), and was given the opportunity to develop his own games. He invented SCUMM, a technology used in many subsequent games. After leaving LucasArts, Gilbert co-founded the children's gaming company Humongous Entertainment in 1992 and its sister company Cavedog Entertainment in 1995, where he produced games such as Total Annihilation for adults.

He cofounded Hulabee Entertainment with Shelley Day, releasing children's games between 2001 and 2003. After working with Beep Games between 2004 and 2007, he was creative director at Vancouver-based Hothead Games development studio between 2008 and 2010, also doing some work for Telltale Games and with Penny Arcade. In 2013, he announced that he would move on from Double Fine Productions, after releasing the game The Cave with them. In 2017, he announced Thimbleweed Park with Terrible Toybox, serving as writer, designer, and programmer since 2014.

Biography

Early career
Ron Gilbert was raised in La Grande, Oregon. He is the son of David E. Gilbert, a physics professor and former president of Eastern Oregon University (then Eastern Oregon State College). Initially, he thought of himself going into a career for film direction. He became interested in games when he was thirteen years old thanks to a HP-65 programmable calculator his father used to bring home. He found the ability to program games on the calculator interesting, citing an example of a Battleship-like game that was included on the calculator, leading him wanting him to learn how to program other games. Gilbert saw the potential to program games as a creative outlet as he continued his studies towards the film industry. Another thing that made him approach the gaming world was the film Star Wars (1977). His fascination with programming technology, which allowed gamers to interact with characters and situations, mixed with his love for telling stories, like that of "Star Wars", were his main inspirations to start making games.

The impact of Star Wars and his love for telling stories was so big that Ron Gilbert, at the age of fourteen, and his good friend Tom McFarlane made a couple of films on a Super-8 camera. The first film they shot in 1978 was Stars Blasters; it was directed by Ron Gilbert and acted by McFarlane and friend Frank Lang. In 1979, they filmed another movie, Tomorrow Never Came, acted by Ron Gilbert, Tom McFarlane; it was also directed by Ron Gilbert.

In 1979, his parents purchased a NorthStar Horizon home computer. At the age of fifteen, he took his first steps in game programming. He used to study and analyze games for hours; capturing in his mind every frame of the layout of games like Donkey Kong, Pac-Man, Asteroids, Space Invaders or Robotron: 2084; taking notes of every detail and then trying to replicate them on his computer. Once the games were replicated he would start doing experiments with them, adding changes. He also used to look at Atari 2600 games' advertisements in magazines, then imagined what the game was like to play and tried to make them on his computer. Once the games were finished, he used to bring his friends home to test the games and tell him what they did or did not like.

LucasArts
Gilbert began his professional career in 1983 while he was still a student at Eastern Oregon State College by writing a program named Graphics BASIC with Tom McFarlane. They sold the program to a San Francisco Bay Area company named HESware, which later offered Gilbert a job. He spent about half a year at HESware, programming action games for the Commodore 64 (C64). None of them were ever released; the company went out of business. Shortly thereafter, Gilbert joined Lucasfilm Games, which later became LucasArts. There he earned his living by doing C64 ports of Lucasfilm Atari 800 games. In 1985, he got the opportunity to co-develop his own game for LucasArts together with graphics artist Gary Winnick. Maniac Mansion was about a dark Victorian mansion populated by a mad scientist, his family and strange aliens.

Maniac Mansion features cutscenes, a word coined by Gilbert, that interrupt gameplay to advance the story and inform the player about offscreen events. Gilbert created a scripting language that was named after the project it had been written for, the Script Creation Utility for Maniac Mansion, better known as S.C.U.M.M. The technology was used in all subsequent LucasArts adventure games, with the exception of Grim Fandango and Escape From Monkey Island. Despite being an internal production tool, the S.C.U.M.M. acronym became well known to gamers since a location in The Secret of Monkey Island, the SCUMM Bar, was named after it.

Gilbert created many successful adventure games at LucasArts, including the classic The Secret of Monkey Island and Monkey Island 2: LeChuck's Revenge. In 1992, he left the company to start Humongous Entertainment with LucasArts producer Shelley Day. While at Humongous Entertainment, Gilbert was responsible for games such as Putt-Putt, Fatty Bear, Freddi Fish, Pajama Sam, and the Backyard Sports series. Many of these games continued to use an offshoot of the S.C.U.M.M. engine.

Post-LucasArts
In 1995, Gilbert founded Cavedog Entertainment, Humongous' sister company for non-kids games. In 1996, GameSpot named him as the 15th on their list of the most influential people in computer gaming of all time. In 1997, Computer Gaming World similarly ranked him as number 15 on the list of the most influential people of all time in computer gaming for inventing the S.C.U.M.M. engine. While at Cavedog, Gilbert was the producer of Total Annihilation and worked on a game titled Good & Evil. Widely regarded as his pet project, Good & Evil was said to incorporate many different themes and gameplay styles. The game was previewed by several publications, but the project was cancelled when Cavedog closed down in 1999. In an interview with GameSpot conducted a while after Cavedog's shut-down, Gilbert said the Good & Evil project had suffered due to him trying to design a game and run a company at the same time.

As of 2005, Ron Gilbert was independently designing an unspecified new adventure/RPG, which he was pitching to publishers. He also started a blog "Grumpy Gamer", offering game industry commentary, occasionally in the form of animated cartoons that he created with Voodoo Vince designer Clayton Kauzlaric.

In 2007, Gilbert created "Threepwood", an exclusively Monkey Island-themed guild on the World of Warcraft server Quel'Dorei, and Gilbert began to collaborate with Hothead Games on Penny Arcade Adventures: On the Rain-Slick Precipice of Darkness, a game based on the webcomic Penny Arcade. He was chosen to be the Keynote Speaker for Penny Arcade Expo for 2009.

In January 2008, he joined Hothead Games as creative director, with whom he was developing DeathSpank, an adventure/R.P.G. Although still working at Hothead Games, Gilbert contributed to the design for Telltale Games' Tales of Monkey Island, taking part in the brainstorming process early in the development of the game. The episodic fifth entry in the Monkey Island series marked the first time Gilbert worked on a Monkey Island game since 1991's LeChuck's Revenge. On April 6, 2010, on his blog he announced that he left Hothead Games. He will continue to promote DeathSpank with Electronic Arts.

In September 2010, it was revealed that Gilbert had been hired by fellow former LucasArts game designer Tim Schafer, to work at Schafer's own Double Fine Productions. In February 2012, Tim Schafer confirmed he will be working with Ron Gilbert on a new adventure game. In May 2012, the game was revealed as The Cave, which was released as a downloadable title by Sega in 2013.

After the buying of LucasArts by The Walt Disney Company in 2012, the rights to the Monkey Island series became the company's property. Ron Gilbert has been quoted in November 2012 as not being optimistic about the franchise's future, believing that Disney might abandon the franchise in favor of Pirates of the Caribbean; however, in December 2012, he was also quoted as wishing to contact Disney, hoping to "make the game he wants to make".

In March 2013, Gilbert left Double Fine Productions revealing that his joining the studio was purely for the creation of The Cave: "I was telling him [Tim Schafer] about The Cave and he really liked it, so he said 'come to Double Fine and make it'. It was really all about making that game." Most recently he worked on the iOS and Android game Scurvy Scallywags with DeathSpank co-creator Clayton Kauzlaric.

On November 18, 2014, it was revealed that he had reunited with Gary Winnick, with whom he created his early critically acclaimed point-and-click games at LucasArts, and that they were working together on a new point-and-click game called Thimbleweed Park. The game reached its funding target on the crowd sourcing site Kickstarter on December 18 and was released on March 30, 2017, in full "talkie" mode for Windows, Linux, Mac and Xbox One. A port to iOS and Android was confirmed after the project met its last stretch-goal.

On May 23, 2016, Gilbert took to Twitter to express a desire to buy back earlier LucasArts franchises saying "Please sell me my Monkey Island and Maniac Mansion IP. I'll pay actual money for them.". In 2017, fans of the series launched an online petition in support of Ron Gilbert, asking Disney to sell the franchises to him; as of December 2021, the petition has gathered about 29,000 signatures.

On March 15, 2018, Gilbert announced he was in the early stages of developing an RPG called A Little Something.

On April 4, 2022, Gilbert announced on his Twitter account that he'd been working on Return to Monkey Island for the past two years in complete secrecy.

Games

Written works

References

External links

 Grumpy Gamer - Ron Gilbert's blog
 
 Ron Gilbert's complete biography (January 31, 2010) (Mirrored May 13, 2010)
 

1964 births
American bloggers
American male bloggers
American video game designers
American video game producers
American video game programmers
Double Fine people
Living people
Lucasfilm people